Coach Trip is a British reality television game show that involves ordinary couples, with a pre-existing relationship, board a coach and travel to destinations around Europe. Those who board the coach must also try to avoid periodic eliminations. The show was renewed for a ninth series following a lengthy hiatus; the eighth series aired back in 2012 before the London 2012 Summer Olympics and Paralympics.

It began on 27 January 2014, airing weekdays at 17:30 on Channel 4 from episodes 1 to 15, however was moved to an earlier timeslot of 17:00 from episodes 16 to 29 due to Superstar Dogs: Countdown to Crufts. Due to the 2014 Winter Paralympics opening ceremony on Channel 4, episode 30 was instead aired on More4 at 12:10 on 8 March 2014. The ninth series saw Brendan Sheerin return as tour guide, as in all previous editions and Paul Donald continue as coach driver, with MT09 MTT the registration of the coach once again. Filming took place between September and October 2013. The ninth series includes visits to Sardinia, being the first series to do so.

Contestants
 Indicates the couple were aboard the coach
 Indicates that the couple were voted as the most popular couple and won series 
 Indicates that the couple were voted as the second most popular couple 
 Indicates that the couple were voted as the third most popular couple 
 Indicates the couple got a yellow card
 Indicates the couple got a red card

Voting History
 Indicates that the couple received a yellow card
 Indicates that the couple was red carded off the trip 
 Indicates that the couple left the coach due to other reasons than being voted off or being removed from the coach 
 Indicates that the couple was immune from any votes cast against them due to it either being their first vote or winning immunity from the vote
 Indicates that the couple were voted as the most popular couple and won series 
 Indicates that the couple were voted as the second most popular couple 
 Indicates that the couple were voted as the third most popular couple 
 Indicates that the couple were voted as the fourth most popular couple

No post-vote arrivals, timekeepers or removals in series

The Trip Day-by-Day

References

2014 British television seasons
Coach Trip series
Television shows set in Belgium
Television shows set in France
Television shows set in Italy
Television shows set in Luxembourg
Television shows set in Spain